Sanhan may refer to:

Samhan, a period of Korean history
Sanhan, Yemen